"Fatzcarraldo" is the fourteenth episode of the twenty-eighth season of the American animated television series The Simpsons, and the 610th episode of the series overall. It aired in the United States on Fox on February 12, 2017. The title is a spoof of the 1982 film Fitzcarraldo.

This episode was dedicated in memory of animator Sooan Kim.

Plot
After Homer wins a button-counting contest and is allowed to leave work early (a cover for Mr. Burns to hide skeletons in the warehouse), Homer is happy as he heads home but looks horrified when he sees the cars of Marge's sisters in the driveway. Patty and Selma make the family go to the 38th annual DMV awards, which is the DMV's awards show that they will be hosting. Homer leaves the place in rage and leaves his family behind. He tries going to Krusty Burger, but they have taken all the meat off the menu and replaced it with vegan food. Homer drives around town, seeing that all restaurants have done this too. He comes across a rusty old trailer that serves gloriously unhealthy chili dogs and happily chows down.

The next day, Homer tells his family about the hot dog stand. Grampa tells him that when Homer was a boy, he used to take him there all the time. When he and Mona argued with each other, they went to a marriage counselor, which was next to the hot dog stand. They left Homer there and the guy who worked there gave him hot dogs, which made Homer start eating away his misery. Back in the present, Patty and Selma have lost all their money in a bet at the DMV award show as well as their jobs by spending $100,000 on a $43 budget, so they are going to live with the Simpsons for a while. Homer returns to the hot dog stand and asks the owner if he remembers him, but the owner says he doesn't. Meanwhile, Springfield Elementary has a radio show, run by the 4th graders and Lisa is included. Everyone else on the show is acting ridiculous and Lisa is the only normal one.

Eventually, Homer's attendance at the hot dog stand brings popularity to the stand and costs Krusty Burger business. Lisa does an interview at the detention and the radio station gets shut down by Principal Skinner, due to the funding has run out for the radio station. Lisa feels bad about it, so Homer brings her to the hot dog store to cheer her up. When they get there, Homer learns the stand has been shut down by the health department, due to Krusty ratting them out. Krusty then buys out the stand and plans to raise prices nearly 600% and pay for a celebrity spokesman. Homer protests this and he ties the restaurant stand chain to his car and drives off, taking the hot dog store with him. Homer ends up on the news. Comic Book Guy leads a rebellion of obese dudes to save the stand, while the local fast-food barons resolve to help Krusty get the place back (one of them, a KFC Southern Colonel type, strongly hints that he was part of the Confederate Army during the U.S. Civil War). On their drive, the stand, with Homer in it, goes off a bridge and is dangling from the chain. The owner of the stand comes back to Homer and saves him, revealing that he does remember Homer after all. He tells him that he does not need the stand, and that the only reason why he thought it was so sacred is because it helped get him through some tough family times, not because of the content of the restaurant. Homer lets the stand fall to the ground, releasing the intoxicating aroma of the hot dogs into the air. Bart and Marge come to collect Homer, telling him he has become an overnight celebrity for his efforts to save the stand, and Chief Wiggum lets him leave instead of arresting him. In the tag scene, the Springfield fast food tycoons eat the cooked mascots of their businesses.

Reception
Dennis Perkins of The A.V. Club gave the episode a C+, stating "The episode, credited to Michael Price, aims for the heart, but lacks the focus to hit it. Homer, mysteriously drawn to Deuce’s Caboose Chili Dogs in 'Seldom-Seen County,' bonds with the crusty 97-year-old owner for reasons he can’t quite recall. At least until Grandpa reminds Homer that the younger Deuce used to give him free chili dogs and call him H-Dog when young Homer waited out Abe and Mona’s fruitless attempts to save their marriage at a nearby counselor’s office. Flashing back to how Deuce’s kindness...were his only refuge from fear and loneliness, Homer has the breakthrough that that’s when he started eating his emotions. Fair enough. Sure, The Simpsons’ elastic reality makes groundbreaking revelations like these a matter of course, so we can forgive that we’ve never heard of Deuce before, and likely won’t again. (A shame, since the always-dependable Kevin Michael Richardson should be upgraded to regular supporting cast by this point.)"

Tony Sokol of Den of Geek rated the episode 4.5 out of 5 stars, stating "The episode is loaded with great lines and sight gags....This is what The Simpsons should be about, nothing, not Seinfeld nothing, which could be anything. But the kind of nothing that is the nutritional value of most of what we plan on eating this week, only with extra karo syrup. The simple closing of a hot dog stand is a chance to make a last stand and to do it in a cannibalistically comic fashion."

"Fatzcarraldo" scored a 1.0 rating and was watched by 2.40 million people, making it Fox's highest rated show of the night.

References

External links
 

2017 American television episodes
The Simpsons (season 28) episodes